Coilostylis parkinsoniana (Parkinson's coilostylis), formerly Epidendrum parkinsonianum, is an epiphytic species of orchid in the genus Coilostylis, occurring in Mexico and Central America.

parkinsoniana